No More Dirty Deals is Johnny Van Zant's début solo album.

Track listing
 "No More Dirty Deals" (Johnny Van Zant, Erik Lundgren, Donnie Van Zant)  – 5:25
 "Coming Home" (J. Van Zant, Robert Gay) - 4:08
 "634-5789" (Eddie Floyd, Steve Cropper)  – 2:43
 "Put My Trust in You" (J. Van Zant, Gay, Robert Morris)  – 2:44
 "Only the Strong Survive" (J. Van Zant, Marvin Jarret, Gay, Morris)  – 4:14
 "Hard Luck Story" (J. Van Zant, Lundgren)  – 3:08
 "Stand Your Ground" (D. Van Zant, J. Van Zant, Gay)  – 3:11
 "Never Too Late" (J. Van Zant, Lundgren)  – 3:44
 "Keep On Rollin'" (J. Van Zant, Al Kooper, Donny Clausman, Gay)  – 3:27
 "Standing in the Darkness" (J. Van Zant, Gay)  – 4:57

Personnel
 Johnny Van Zant - vocals
 Robbie Gay - lead guitar
 Erik Lundgren - lead guitar
 Danny Clausman - bass guitar
 Robbie Morris - drums
 Al Kooper - keyboards

1980 debut albums
Polydor Records albums
Albums produced by Al Kooper